Albert Mien-fu Chang is a condensed matter physicist.

Chang earned a bachelor of science degree in physics from the Massachusetts Institute of Technology in 1977. After completing doctoral study in the same subject at Princeton University in 1983, he successively worked for Bell Laboratories, AT&T Technologies, and Lucent from 1984 to 1997. Chang began his teaching career at Purdue University in 1997 and joined the Duke University faculty in 2003. In 2000, Chang was elected a fellow of the American Physical Society, "[f]or experimental studies of quantum Hall edge states and Luttinger liquids".

References

American condensed matter physicists
21st-century American physicists
Massachusetts Institute of Technology alumni
Duke University faculty
Princeton University alumni
Fellows of the American Physical Society
Purdue University faculty
Scientists at Bell Labs
20th-century American physicists
Year of birth missing (living people)
Living people